Coorey is a surname. Notable people with the surname include:

 C.A. Coorey (1921–2004), Sri Lankan civil servant
 Matthew Coorey (born 1973), Australian conductor 
 Michael Coorey (born 1975), rugby player
 Phil Coorey, Australian journalist

See also
 Cooley (surname)

Sinhalese surnames